Women are adult female humans.

Women may also refer to:

Literature
 Women (Bukowski novel), a 1978 novel by Charles Bukowski
 Women (Sebastian novel), a 1933 novel by Mihail Sebastian
 Women, the second book in the Mothers and Daughters comic book series by Dave Sim
 The Women (novel), a 2009 novel by T.C. Boyle
 The Women, a 1996 book by Hilton Als
 Women (Sollers novel)
 The Women (play), written by Clare Boothe Luce and first staged in December 1936

Film and television
 Women (1934 film), a Chinese drama directed by Shi Dongshan
 The Women (1939 film), an American comedy-drama directed by George Cukor, based on the play by Clare Booth Luce (see above)
 Women (1966 film), a Russian film
 Women (1977 film), a Hungarian film
 Women (1985 film), a Hong Kong drama directed by Stanley Kwan
 Women (1997 film), an internationally co-produced drama
 Women – for America, for the World, a 1986 short documentary 
 The Women (2008 film), an update of the 1936 play and 1939 film, written and directed by Diane English
 Women: Stories of Passion, an American television series
 Vous les femmmes (TV series), a French comedy show, translated as WOMEN! on British television
 The Heart of Woman, a Taiwanese television series, also known as Women

Music
 "Women" (Def Leppard song), 1987
 "Women" (Foreigner song), 1979
 "Women" (Lou Reed song), 1982
 "Women" (Amanda Lear song), 1985
 Women (band), a Calgary indie rock band
 Women (album), their 2008 debut

Other uses
 An-Nisa ("Women"), the fourth chapter of the Qur'an
 Women Management, modeling agency

See also
 Mujeres (disambiguation) (Spanish for "Women")
 Woman (disambiguation)